Ali Abdulla Al-Ubaydli (born 1850 - died 1942) was a merchant, philanthropist and pioneer in Bahrain. At the turn of the 20th century, he was behind building the first modern port in Bahrain which was an important step in modernising the country. He also took part in the first attempt to supply the capital city with fresh water. The two wells he built gave water to local residents and to Bahrain's pearl divers.

Ali also supported the creation of the first modern school in Bahrain and, when the first school opened for girls, he encouraged his daughters to enroll. One of his great-grandsons, Dr Mohammad Al-Ubaydli, created a scholarship in his memory.

External links
Alobaidly scholarship

alobaidly, Ali Abdulla Al-
obaidly, Ali Abdulla Al-
1942 deaths
1850 births